What's It All About may refer to:

 What's It All About (Lil' Chris album), 2008
 What's It All About (Pat Metheny album), 2011
 "What's It All About" (song), a song by Run-D.M.C.
 "What's It All About", a song by James from the album Living in Extraordinary Times